NH 11B may refer to:

 National Highway 11B (India)
 New Hampshire Route 11B, United States